Alper Akçam (born 1 September 1987 in Bad Kreuznach) is a German-born Turkish footballer who currently plays for Manisa BB.

Career
Akçam made his debut on the professional league level in the 2. Bundesliga for 1. FC Kaiserslautern on 4 April 2008, when he came on as a substitute in the 67th minute in a game against TSG 1899 Hoffenheim. In summer 2010, Akçam moved to Gaziantepspor.

References

External links
 

1987 births
Living people
German footballers
1. FC Kaiserslautern players
1. FC Kaiserslautern II players
Gaziantepspor footballers
Wormatia Worms players
Süper Lig players
2. Bundesliga players
German people of Turkish descent
Association football forwards
Manisa FK footballers
People from Bad Kreuznach
Footballers from Rhineland-Palatinate